= La Chata =

Restaurant in Guadalajara, Jalisco, Mexico

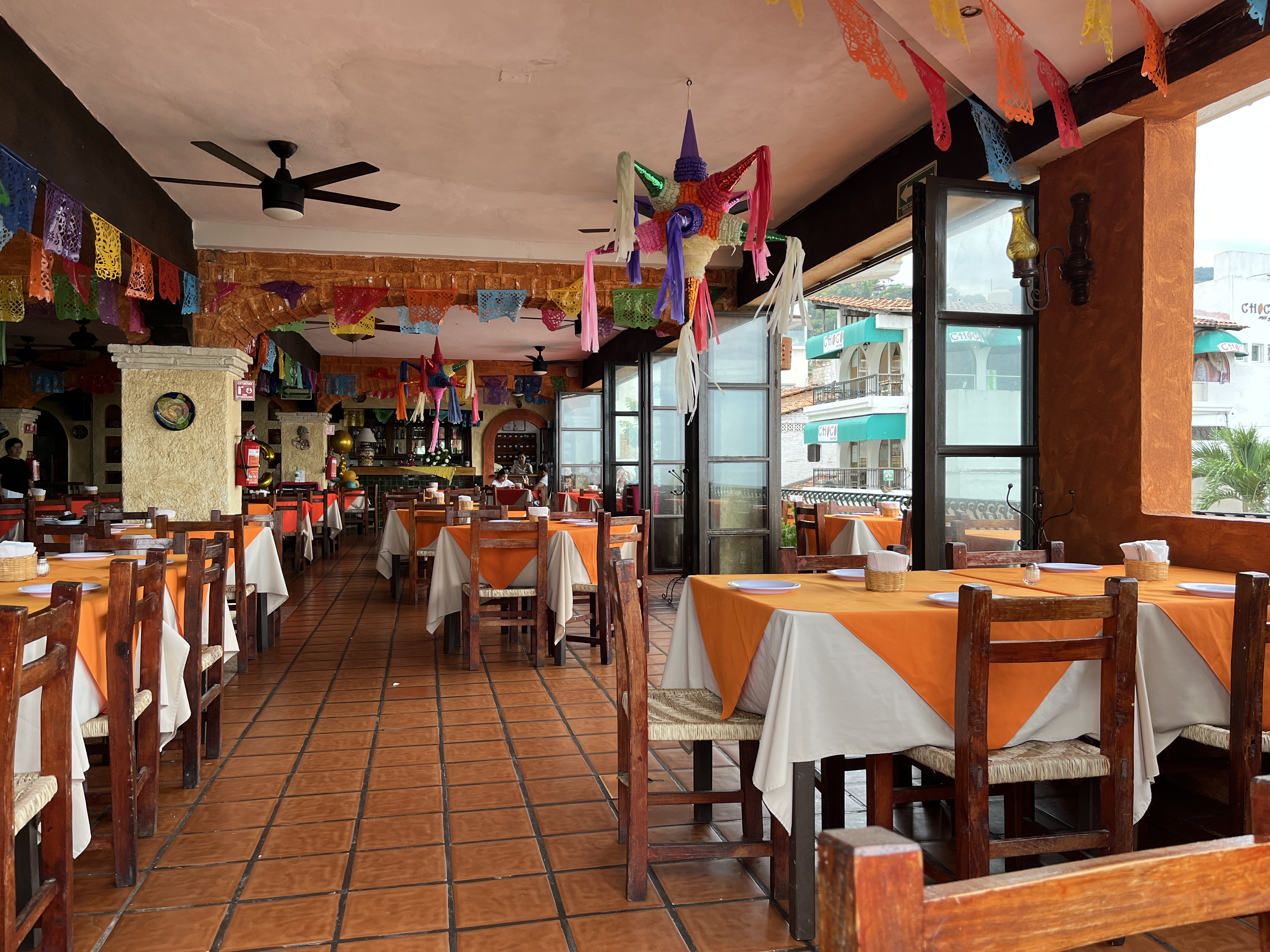
- Interior of the restaurant in Puerto Vallarta, Jalisco

Restaurant information
- Established: 1942
- Website: lachata.com.mx

La Chata is a restaurant with multiple locations, based in Guadalajara, in the Mexican state of Jalisco.

The restaurant was established by Carmen Castorena in 1942.
